Acora District is one of fifteen districts of the Puno Province in the Puno Region, Peru.

History 
The city of Acora and the lands that are now part of the district were once the seat of the Caciques Catacora. Acora District was created by Law on May 2, 1954, in Ramón Castilla term.

Geography 
Other mountains are listed below:

Ethnic groups 
The people in the district are mainly indigenous citizens of Aymara descent. Aymara is the language which the majority of the population (87.14%) learnt to speak in childhood, 12.32% of the residents started speaking using the Spanish language (2007 Peru Census).

Authorities

Mayors 
 2011-2014: Gerónimo Cutipa Cutipa. 
 2007-2010: Iván Joel Flores Quispe.

Festivities 
 Our Lady of the Nativity.

See also 
 Mulluq'u
 Q'axilu
 Q'inq'u

References

External links 
  Official district web site
  INEI Peru